Phyllonorycter kumatai is a moth of the family Gracillariidae. It is known from the Nepal.

The wingspan is 6-6.5 mm.

The larvae feed on Prunus cerasoides. They mine the leaves of their host plant. The mine has the form of an elongate, narrow, tentiformed occurring upon the lower surface of the leaf, usually situated on the space between two lateral veins or rarely along the leaf-margin. The lower epidermis of the leaf on a fully developed mine is brownish-white with minute dark brown spots and with a single longitudinal central ridge.

References

kumatai
Moths of Asia
Moths described in 2005